The One, The Only Kay Starr is a studio album by Kay Starr. It was released in 1956 by RCA Victor (catalog no. LPM-1149). It was her first album for RCA Victor after a decade with Capitol Records.

Reception

Upon its release, Billboard magazine wrote: "A collection of a dozen standards that Kay Starr has not recorded previously, done in her characteristic style: earthy, blues-touched, sung from the heart."

AllMusic gave the album a rating of three stars. Reviewer William Ruhlmann wrote that, with her "rhythmic, emotive vocal performances", and interpretations tending toward jump blues and rhythm & blues, she came off as "another significant pre-rock progenitor"."

Track listing
Side A
 "A Hundred Years From Today"
 "Wrap Your Troubles In Dreams"
 "Glad Rag Doll"
 "Fit as a Fiddle"
 "My Buddy"
 "You Can Depend On Me"

Side B
 "I Want a Little Boy"
 "I'll Never Say 'Never Again' Again"
 "The Prisoner's Song"	
 "Once More"	
 "Georgia on My Mind"	
 "Jump for Joy"

References

1956 albums
Kay Starr albums
RCA Victor albums